The Saruhashi Prize (猿橋賞) is an annual prize awarded to a Japanese woman researcher in the natural sciences. The prize recognises accomplishments in research as well as the mentoring of other women scientists.

Japanese geochemist Katsuko Saruhashi retired from her position as the director of the Geochemical Research Laboratory in 1980. Her co-workers gifted her ¥5 million and she used the money to establish the Association for the Bright Future of Women Scientists in 1980. The association distributes an annual ¥300,000 prize. It is only available to scientists who are under the age of 50.

The book My Life: Twenty Japanese Women Scientists, edited by Yoshihide Kozai, includes essays by twenty of the Saruhashi Prize winners.

Recipients

See also 
 List of general science and technology awards

References

Awards established in 1981
Science awards honoring women
Japanese science and technology awards
Japanese women
1981 establishments in Japan